Heinz Franke (born 4 August 1928) is a German former sports shooter. He competed in the 25 metre pistol event at the 1960 Summer Olympics.

References

External links
 

1928 births
Possibly living people
German male sport shooters
Olympic shooters of the United Team of Germany
Shooters at the 1960 Summer Olympics
People from Wurzen
Sportspeople from Saxony